Margaritifera marrianae, the Alabama pearlshell, is a species of freshwater mussel, an aquatic bivalve mollusk in the family Margaritiferidae, the freshwater pearl mussels.

This species is endemic to the United States.  It is threatened by habitat loss.

References

Molluscs of the United States
marrianae
Molluscs described in 1983
Taxonomy articles created by Polbot
ESA endangered species